Alun Jones (born 26 April 1980) is a retired Australian professional tennis player. 

Jones started playing tennis at age 7. His parents are David, a civil engineer, and Susan. Jones wife is Jill and he has a son called Robbie who has played for Australia in the ANZ Cup in Futsal. Jones also likes playing rugby, soccer, basketball and cricket. Alun played the role of Tom Cavendish in the 2004 movie Wimbledon.

Summer of 2007 
During the summer of 2007, Jones obtained a 20–4 record at several Challenger tournaments and one Futures tournament. This took his world ranking from 198 to a career high of 123. He was granted a wildcard to the 2007 US Open under a reciprocal agreement with Australian Open. He was eliminated in the first round, losing in four sets to second seed Rafael Nadal.

Singles titles

References

External links
 
 
 
 
 Jones World Ranking History

Australian male tennis players
Australian people of Belgian descent
Naturalised citizens of Australia
Naturalised tennis players
People from Boksburg
Sportspeople from Canberra
South African people of Belgian descent
South African emigrants to Australia
Tennis people from the Australian Capital Territory
1980 births
Living people
Sportspeople from Gauteng